Kim Tae-Yeon (born 27 June 1988 in Seoul) is a South Korean footballer who plays as a defensive midfielder, he has also been used as a centre-back.

Club career statistics

References

External links

https://us.soccerway.com/players/tae-yeon-kim/5429/

Living people
1988 births
Association football midfielders
South Korean footballers
South Korean expatriate footballers
Vissel Kobe players
Ehime FC players
Mito HollyHock players
Fagiano Okayama players
Tokyo Verdy players
Roasso Kumamoto players
Daejeon Hana Citizen FC players
Gwangju FC players
Busan IPark players
J1 League players
J2 League players
K League 1 players
K League 2 players
China League One players
Expatriate footballers in Japan
South Korean expatriate sportspeople in Japan
Expatriate footballers in China
South Korean expatriate sportspeople in China
Footballers from Seoul